Walckenaeria vilbasteae is a spider species found in Finland and Estonia.

See also 
 List of Linyphiidae species (Q–Z)

References

External links 

Linyphiidae
Spiders of Europe
Spiders described in 1979